The men's 5 km race at the 2009 World Championships occurred on Tuesday, 21 July at Ostia Beach in Rome, Italy. In total, 41 participants from 24 countries competed in the race.

Note: The women's and men's 5 km races at the 2009 Worlds were originally scheduled to be held on Sunday, July 19; however, high wind and surf conditions on-course caused the FINA Bureau to postpone the race until July 21.

Results

Key: OTL = Outside time limit

See also
Open water swimming at the 2007 World Aquatics Championships – Men's 5 km

References

2009 Worlds results: Men's 5K from OmegaTiming.com (official timer of the 2009 Worlds); retrieved 2009-07-21.

World Aquatics Championships
Open water swimming at the 2009 World Aquatics Championships